Pretty Dark Things is the fifth studio album by American hip hop group, CYNE.

Track list
Just Say No
Runaway, The
Calor
Escape
Money Parade
Pretty Black Future
Elephant Rome
Dance, The
Opera
Prototypes
Fuzzy Logic
Never Forget Pluto
Pianos On Fire
Radiant Cool Boy
Excite Me
Scattered

References

2008 albums
Cyne albums